The Philippine Military Academy ( / ) also referred to by its acronym PMA is the premier military academy for Filipinos aspiring for a commission as a military officer of the Armed Forces of the Philippines (AFP). It was established on December 21, 1935, by the virtue of National Defense Act of 1935. It is patterned after the United States Military Academy, in West Point, New York. The academy is located in the city of Baguio, and serves as the primary training school for future officers of the AFP.

The academy traces its roots to 1898, when Emilio Aguinaldo decreed the establishment of the Academia Militar in the Philippines. The present academy serves as a national historical landmark for historic contribution and its “long and unending line of quality military education.” The campus is a popular tourist destination in Baguio.

Cadet candidates for admission must undergo and pass series of testing (Written, Physical, Medical and Neuro-Psychiatric); around 400 men and women enter the academy each June. Students are officers-in-training and referred to as "cadets" or collectively as the "Cadet Corps Armed Forces of the Philippines" (CCAFP). Tuition and monthly allowances are fully funded by the government in exchange for an active duty service obligation upon graduation.

The academic program grants a Bachelor of Science in National Security Management with a curriculum that maintains a high level standard of cadet's performance in academics, military tactics and sports & physical fitness. Cadets are required to conform with the Honor Code which states that "We, the cadets, do not lie, cheat, steal, nor tolerate among us those who do." PMA bases cadet's development in four aspects: character, academics, military and physical. Graduates are commissioned as second lieutenants in the Philippine Army and Philippine Air Force and as ensigns in the Philippine Navy.

Despite the limited baccalaureate offered, the academy consistently places in the top 100 Universities and Colleges in Philippines for its quality education and management. PMA is ISO 9001:2015 certified.

History 
An Officer's School of the Philippine Constabulary was established on February 17, 1905, within the walls of Intramuros in Manila. This school was relocated to Baguio on September 1, 1908, at Camp Henry Allen where it would stay for many years to come. On February 4, 1916, a cadet academy denominated the Academy for officers of the Philippine Constabulary was created for training and instructing cadets and preparing them for service as commissioned officers of the Philippine Constabulary or of any other armed force of the Philippine Government which might later be created. On December 8, 1928, the academy was renamed as The Philippine Constabulary Academy.

The National Defense Act was approved on December 21, 1935, creating the Army of the Philippines and incorporating the Constabulary into that organization. Tha Act also established a Constabulary Division within the PMA and a Philippine Military Academy (PMA), but specified that the PMA operation was not a Constabulary function. The PMA was modeled after the United States Military Academy with officers from the Philippine Scouts and regular United States Army as instructors and members of the general staff. PMA Class of 1940, with 79 graduates, was the pioneer batch to complete four years of training. Quirico Evangelista and Reynaldo Mendoza of Class '40 composed the PMA alma mater song, "PMA, Oh Hail to Thee."

With the outbreak of the Second World War, training was disrupted at the PMA with Classes 1942 and 1943 being graduated prematurely and assigned to combat units in Bataan and other parts of the country. Many of these young officers perished in the war.

After the war, the academy was reopened on May 5, 1947, at Camp Henry T. Allen in Baguio and, due to its increasing need for larger grounds, was soon moved to its present location at Fort General Gregorio H. del Pilar, Loakan, some ten kilometers from downtown Baguio. The main building, Melchor Hall, was completed in 1949 under the supervision of military engineer Lt. Pacifico C. Cabrera, a decorated WWII hero, who later as a full colonel, became Chief of Engineers of the AFP.  During the 1960s, as a need for more well-rounded individuals was found to be desirable, and socio-humanistic courses were added to the school's curriculum.

1993 proved a momentous year for the PMA as its first female cadets were admitted and specialization based on branch-of-service was introduced into the curriculum. The first female cadets graduated from the academy in 1997.

In 1998, a proclamation by the President of the Philippines, while acknowledging the academy's roots lay with the 1905 founding of the Philippine Constabulary school, changed the official celebration day of the academy to October 25, in honor of the Academia Militar which was established on October 25, 1898, in Malolos, Bulacan. Other sources have since acknowledged this change. The Academia Militar was opened during the establishment of the insurgent First Philippine Republic. It was closed on January 20, 1899, before the Philippine–American War and thus was the first ever all-Filipino military academy to be established.

Curriculum

Academic program
Headed by the dean of academics, the academic program has both military and civilian male and female instructors. It has the following seven departments:
 Department of Managerial Sciences
 Department of Mathematics
 Department of Humanities
 Department of Physical Sciences
 Department of Engineering Sciences
 Department of Social Sciences
 Department of Information and Computing Sciences

On June 1, 2019, the PMA upgraded its academic curriculum; every cadet now focuses on national security management in response to the growing national security threats at home and overseas. Upon completing the 4-year program, cadets graduate and earn the degree of BS National Security Management and commissioned as 2nd Lieutenant or Ensign in the service branches of the Armed Forces by the authority of the President.

Military program
This program is headed by the Commandant of Cadets and is responsible for the professional military training, character development, leadership, and physical training of the cadets. The mission of the Tactics Group is likewise carried out by the tactical officers who are responsible for the different companies of the Cadet Corps. This group is made up of the following departments:

 Department of Leadership Development
 Department of Physical Education
 Department of Ground Warfare
 Department of Air Warfare
 Department of Naval Warfare

Cadet life

Four classes
Unlike other colleges and universities, cadets are not referred to as freshmen, sophomores, juniors, or seniors. They are classified as fourth class, third class, second class, and first class cadets.

 Fourth class Cadets are the first year students. In the academy, they are called "plebes" and are the equivalent of the college freshmen in civilian universities. The first day of plebe hood starts with the Reception Ceremonies on June 1 of each year. Then, they undergo an eight-week summer training or "beast barracks" during which time they are indoctrinated with the military and cadet systems of training. During this period, the plebes form the New Cadet Battalion and their training is handled by the tactical officers and upper-class cadets forming the "Plebe Detail." After the beast barracks, the plebes are formally accepted into the ranks of the Cadet Corps in another ceremony called Incorporation which is held during the last week of July.
Third class Cadets are the sophomores in civilian universities, and are referred to as "yearlings" in the academy. Upon completion of fourth class year, the yearling adjusts to life as an upper class cadet. Although they are the least ranking of the upper class cadets, they are now entitled to the privileges of being upper class cadets. One of their responsibilities is being a "buddy" to a plebe. As buddies, they set the examples of how a cadet should behave and they are responsible for ensuring that the plebes conform with the standards of cadet ship.
Second class Cadets are also called the "cows". The second class year marks the point at which the cadet starts to specialize according to the branch of service he or she has elected to join upon graduation. Thus, the second class cadets may no longer take the same subjects as that of some of his or her classmates. They now take different subjects depending on their choice of branch of service after graduation and fields of specialization. Within the cadet chain of command, the second class cadets now act as squad leaders. Moreover, in the absence of the first class cadets, they take over the responsibility of running the Cadet Corps.
First class Cadets, also known as "firsties", are the ruling class and as such they occupy the major positions of responsibility in the cadet chain of command. They are designated the chairmen and cadet-in-charge of the various committees, clubs and corps squads. They also enjoy certain privileges peculiar only to the "firsties". Their academics are also more specialized as they now embark on the final year of their training for future officership in the Armed Forces of the Philippines.

Organization
The Cadet Corps is organized into a brigade. The highest ranking cadet, the Brigade Commander, is traditionally known as the First Captain or "Baron". The brigade is organized into four battalions. Within each battalion there are two companies. Companies are lettered A through H (Alfa to Hawk). First class cadets hold key leadership positions within the brigade from the First Captain down to platoon leaders within the companies. First class cadets hold the rank of cadet captain and cadet lieutenant. Second class cadets hold the rank of cadet sergeant and serve as squad leaders, third class cadets hold the rank of cadet corporal, and fourth class cadets as cadet private.

Honor code and system
The Philippine Military Academy is governed by an honor code, and it binds the cadets to the following principle — “We, the cadets, do not lie, cheat, steal, nor tolerate among us those who do.”. Cheating, lying, and stealing are major honor code violations. Cadets who will be charged for violating the honor code are subjected to series of trials conducted by Cadets from Honor Committee. When a cadet is found guilty for violating the honor code, he/she will be banned from cadetship. One of the most sensationalized cases was during 2014; the lying case of ex-cadet Aldrin Jeff Cudia.

Hazing videos 
On October 23, 2019, two videos, dated 2017 and 2018, of hazing by the cadets were uploaded on social media. The 2018 video shows a plebe-cadet being punched and kicked by an upper class cadet. Another upper class cadet wearing earphones is seen in the background of the video. In the video, two plebe-cadets were doing squats; when one of them collapses, he is kicked as punishment by an upperclassman. The attack stops when someone opens the door to inspect the room. The 2017 video shows four upperclassmen with two plebes. An upperclassman is seen using his helmet to repeatedly hit one of the plebe's hands and the back of the other plebe. While the upperclassman was hitting the plebes, the other upper class cadets in the background were seen watching and laughing, actively bystanding and allowing the hazing to continue.

Of the six upper-class cadets seen attacking the plebes in the video, five were transferred to the PMA holding center while the academy investigated the incident; on the other hand, the sixth cadet was discharged from the academy due to an "Honor Code" violation.

Admission requirements
 Natural born Filipino citizen
 Physically fit and of good moral character
 Single and has never been married
 Must pass the PMA Entrance Examination
 No Administrative / Criminal Case
 At least High School Graduate with 85% GPA or must graduate not later than June of the year following the date of examination taken for Grade 12 students (K-12)
 Height Requirement for both Male and Female is 5 feet (not to exceed 6’4″ for both)
 At least 17 years old but not a day older than a 22 years on June 1 of the year following the date of examination taken

Notable alumni

Gallery

See also
Philippine Merchant Marine Academy
Philippine National Police Academy
List of notable Philippine Military Academy alumni
Cadet rank in the Philippines
Death of Darwin Dormitorio
National Defense College of the Philippines

References

 Senate Diaries, 4th Philippine Legislature, Volume 1, page 32, October 23, 1916 (original in Spanish)
Original copy located in Adams Building, US Library of Congress
 </ref>

External links
Official website of the Philippine Military Academy

Military academies
Military education and training in the Philippines
Schools in Baguio
Educational institutions established in 1905
Schools in the Philippines
1905 establishments in the Philippines